IPCTV was a Japanese satellite television station based in Tokyo, on the island of Honshu. It operates on channels 514 of the subscription operator SKY PerfecTV and is affiliated to TV Globo Internacional. It is the first Brazilian TV station out of Brazil. Belongs to IPC World Inc.

History 
The station was founded on 7 September 1995 as "PLC Television Network Corporation" and from 1996 began transmitting its satellite signal by SKY PerfecTV.

In 2001, the station was renamed IPCTV and retransmitted 3 stations in 3 different channels: on channel 332, TVE Internacional; on channel 333, RecordTV Internacional and on channel 334, Globo Internacional.

As of August 2007, IPCTV was renamed as IPC World TV.

In 2010, the station was renamed IPCTV, closed the 3 channels and became affiliated only with Globo, broadcasting on channel 514 on SKY PerfecTV. In addition, the broadcaster premieres the JPTV, television news with the news of the country. JPTV was the first "PraçaTV" from outside Brazil.

On 2 December 2014, IPCTV became a mere repeater of TV Globo International, and has no more local programming. The "JPTV", until then only program produced by the broadcaster, is replaced by SPTV 1st Edition, produced by TV Globo São Paulo.

On 31 March 2019, IPCTV was officially closed due to Globo's termination for indefinite period.

External links
 Website IPCTV
 Website of Ipcdigital
 Website of IPC World, Inc

Television stations in Japan
Television channels and stations established in 1996
Grupo Globo subsidiaries
Portuguese-language television stations